John Gaston Peacock (January 10, 1910 – October 17, 1981) was a part-time catcher  in Major League Baseball who played for three teams between  and . He was born in Fremont, North Carolina.

A light-hitting catcher, Peacock was good defensively and knew how to handle his pitching staff. He hit one home run in 1734 career at-bats.

Peacock entered the majors in 1937 with the Boston Red Sox, playing for them through the 1944 midseason before joining the Philadelphia Phillies (1944–1945) and Brooklyn Dodgers (1945). In his rookie season, he hit a .313 batting average in nine games played. The next eight years he averaged 76.25 games in each season, with a career-high 92 games in 1939. His most productive years came with Boston, when he hit .303 with a career-high 39 RBI in 1938, and .284 with 20 doubles in 1941.

In a nine-season career, Peacock was a .262 hitter with one home run and 194 RBI in 619 games, including 175 runs, 455 hits, 74 doubles, 16 triples, 14 stolen bases, and a .333 on-base percentage. A disciplinated hitter with a great knowledge of the strike zone, he posted a solid 2.51 walk-to-strikeout ratio (183-to-73). 
 
In 518 appearances behind the plate, Peacock recorded 1863 outs, 220 assists, 37 double plays, and only 36 errors in 2119 total chances for a .983 fielding percentage.

Peacock died in Wilson, North Carolina, at the age of 71.

External links

Retrosheet
 

Boston Red Sox players
Brooklyn Dodgers players
Philadelphia Phillies players
Major League Baseball catchers
Baseball players from North Carolina
1910 births
1981 deaths
Minor league baseball managers
Wilmington Pirates players
Toronto Maple Leafs (International League) players
Nashville Vols players
Minneapolis Millers (baseball) players
New Orleans Pelicans (baseball) players
People from Wayne County, North Carolina